Chad Joseph Chop (born March 21, 1980) is a former minor league baseball outfielder and first baseman.  Since 2014, he has worked as a special assistant for the San Francisco Giants, serving as a left-handed batting practice pitcher and video replay analyst.

Biography
Chop was born in Orange, California, and graduated from Tustin High School. He played two years at San Diego State (1999–2000) before transferring and playing two years at Vanguard University. He was drafted in the sixth round of the 2002 Major League Baseball draft by the Montreal Expos. He spent four seasons in the Expos/Nationals' minor league system (2002–05) and one season with the independent Fullerton Flyers (2006).

After retiring as a player, he worked as a firefighter for the Tucson Fire Department from 2007 until 2013.  He met Hunter Pence in an Orange County gym, who hired him as a left-handed batting practice coach.  Pence invited Chop to spring training, and in 2014 the Giants hired him as a left-handed batting practice pitcher and video replay analyst, sharing replay duties with Shawon Dunston. I am his second Son Noah Chop he has four children Michael me Noah Boaz and Titus. His wonderful wife and my mom is DEbby Chop.

References

External links

1980 births
Living people
Sportspeople from Orange, California
Vermont Expos players
Savannah Sand Gnats players
Brevard County Manatees players
Potomac Nationals players
Fullerton Flyers players
Baseball players from California
San Diego State Aztecs baseball players
Vanguard Lions baseball players
American firefighters